The men's light flyweight 49 kg boxing event at the 2019 European Games in Minsk was held from 23 to 30 June at the Uruchie Sports Palace.

Schedule
All times are Further European Time (UTC+03:00)

Results

References

External links
Draw Sheet

Men 49